The 2020 J2 League, also known as the  for sponsorship reasons, was the 28th season of J2 League, the top Japanese professional league for association football clubs, since its establishment in 1993. The league started on 21 February 2020. For this season, the league was planned to have a season break to avoid a clash with 2020 Summer Olympics due to be starting from June to August, as the Olympics were postponed by a year.

Effects of the 2019–20 coronavirus pandemic
On 25 February, all J.League matches until March 15 were postponed in response to the COVID-19 pandemic. After that, it was announced that it would be postponed until 29 March. On 19 March, the J.League announced no relegation would take place for the 2020 season, with the J1 League expanding to 20 clubs for the 2021 season.  On 25 March, a further announcement declared that the league would be suspended from 3 April to 6 May.

On 3 April, a decision to start over the official game schedule, which aimed to gradually resume J3 from 25 April, J2 from 2 May, and J1 from 9 May. Note that, considering a new schedule in the future, but it would resume it at least one month later and later in the month.

On 29 May, the J.League announced a resumption of matches on 27 June. On 9 June, the league issued a further  announcement about the schedule of the 2020 season. On 15 June, a new announcement about the New dates was published. The first 2 rounds of matches in each league (J2 2nd-3rd series) were held without spectators. After 10 July, as a rule, the maximum number of people was 5,000 (stadiums with lower capacity were those with less than 50% of the capacity of people, and forbade away supporters). After August, the maximum stadium capacity was 50%, and it would be a “high alert spectator match”.

After the 11th J.League extraordinary executive committee on 20 July, it was announced that the "super strict alert audience game" would be extended to 10 August in view of the spread of coronavirus infection.

Clubs

After spending only one season in J2, Kashiwa Reysol were crowned champions and were promoted to 2020 J1 League along with the runners-up Yokohama FC. The 2019 J3 League champions Giravanz Kitakyushu and runners-up Thespakusatsu Gunma entered the league as the promoted teams, replacing Kagoshima United and FC Gifu who were relegated to 2020 J3 League. Those teams that qualified for promotion playoffs in 2019 were unable to defeat their opponent and thus remained in the 2020 season.

Giravanz Kitakyushu returned to J2 after spending three seasons in J3, while Thespakusatsu Gunma return after spending two seasons.

Meanwhile, Matsumoto Yamaga and Júbilo Iwata joined the 2020 J2 League as relegated teams from 2019 J1 League having placed 17th and 18th respectively.

Personnel and kits

Managerial changes

Foreign players
As of 2020 season, there are no more restrictions on a number of signed foreign players, but clubs can only register up to five foreign players for a single match-day squad. Players from J.League partner nations (Thailand, Vietnam, Myanmar, Malaysia, Cambodia, Singapore, Indonesia and Qatar) are exempt from these restrictions.

Players name in bold indicates the player is registered during the mid-season transfer window.

League table
It was decided on 19 March to change the format regarding the rules for promotion/relegation for the end of the season for the J1, J2 and J3 leagues, such that there would be no relegation this season, that two clubs from the J2 League would be promoted to the 2021 J1 League, and that two clubs from the J3 League would be promoted to the 2021 J2 League (subject to licensing regulations). It was also announced that the J1/J2 play-offs were not be held.

Positions by round

Top scorers
Source:

Attendances

See also
 Japan Football Association (JFA)
 J.League
 2020 J1 League (I)
 2020 J2 League (II)
 2020 J3 League (III)
 2020 Japan Football League (IV)
 2020 Japanese Regional Leagues (V/VI)
 2020 Fuji Xerox Super Cup (Super Cup)
 2020 Emperor's Cup (National Cup)
 2020 J.League YBC Levain Cup (League Cup)

References

External links
 Official website, JLeague.jp 

J2 League
Japan
J2